Dearly Beloved is an English-language term emanating from William Tyndale's translation of the Greek word "ἀγαπητός" as it appears in the Bible, popularized by its inclusion in the matrimonial office and other portions of the 1662 Book of Common Prayer. It may also refer to:

Film 
 Dearly Beloved, a 1995 short film starring Vince Curatola
 Dearly Beloved, a short film starring Jessica Lee Rose

Literature 
 Dearly Beloved (novel), a 1962 novel by Anne Morrow Lindbergh
 Dearly Beloved, a 2009 book by David Wilkerson
 Dearly Beloved, a 1944 novel by Mary Burchell
 Dearly Beloved, a 1990 novel by Mary Jo Putney
 Dearly Beloved, a 1942 novel by Harry Sylvester
 "Dearly Beloved", a short story by F. Scott Fitzgerald, published posthumously in 1969

Music

Albums 
 Dearly Beloved (Daughtry album), 2021
 Dearly Beloved (Lee Konitz album), 1997
 Dearly Beloved (Stanley Turrentine album), 1961
 Dearly Beloved, a 2004 album by Keely Smith

Songs 
 "Dearly Beloved", a 1942 song written by Johnny Mercer and Jerome Kern, introduced by Fred Astaire in the film You Were Never Lovelier
 "Dearly Beloved", the main theme for the Kingdom Hearts video game series, featured on Kingdom Hearts Original Soundtrack
 "Dearly Beloved", a song by Abramelin from Transgression from Acheron
 "Dearly Beloved", a song by Bad Religion from New Maps of Hell
 "Dearly Beloved", a song by Faith Hill from Fireflies
 "Dearly Beloved", a song by John Coltrane from Sun Ship
 "Dearly Beloved", a segment of the song "Jesus of Suburbia" by Green Day
 "Let's Go Crazy", a song by Prince taken from the soundtrack of Purple Rain

Bands 
 The Dearly Beloved, a 1960s garage rock band from Tucson, Arizona
 Dearly Beloved, an Australian band co-founded by Leeno Dee
 Dearly Beloved, an American band that has collaborated with Merritt Gant

Television episodes 
 "The Dearly Beloved", an episode of The O.C.
 "Dearly Beloved" (Greek)
 "Dearly Beloved" (Kate & Allie)
 "Dearly Beloved" (Party of Five)
 "Dearly Beloved" (Valkyria Chronicles)
 "Dearly Beloved" (Wild Card)
 Dearly Beloved (Law & Order: Special Victims Unit

Other uses 
 Dearly Beloved, a 2010 Improvathon event in Liverpool, UK